The 2013–14 Drexel Dragons men's basketball team represented Drexel University during the 2013–14 NCAA Division I men's basketball season. The Dragons, led by 13th year head coach Bruiser Flint, played their home games at the Daskalakis Athletic Center and were members of the Colonial Athletic Association.

On November 18, 2013, head coach Bruiser Flint recorded his 300th career win as an NCAA basketball head coach in defeating Elon. This game was also Bruiser's 214th win as the head coach at Drexel University, making him the winningest coach in Drexel basketball history. Bruiser was recognized for his accomplishments before the home-opener against Cleveland State on December 4.

They finished the season 16–14, 8–8 in CAA play to finish in fourth place. They lost in the quarterfinals of the CAA tournament to Northeastern.

Pre-season

Departures

Incoming transfers

 Junior point guard Freddie Wilson was not eligible to play until the end of the fall semester due to NCAA transfer rules.

Class of 2013 commitments

Roster

 Shooting guard Chris Fouch is coming off his second red-shirt season, after suffering a second season-ending injury in 2012.  He is classified as a graduate student.
 Starting guard Damion Lee suffered a Torn ACL in a game against Arizona on November 27, 2013.  He is expected to Redshirt this season, and maintain 2 years of eligibility remaining entering the 2014–15 season
 Junior forward Kazembe Abif fractured his left hand during practice on February 6, 2014, which required season ending surgery.  Prior to this injury, Abif missed 5 games due to a sprained knee, and 1 game due to a concussion.

Depth chart

Schedule

|-
!colspan=12 style=| Non-conference regular season

|-
!colspan=12 style=| CAA regular season

|-
!colspan=12 style= | CAA Tournament

Team statistics

As of the end of the season. 
 Indicates team leader in each category. 
(FG%, FT% leader = minimum 50 att.; 3P% leader = minimum 20 att.)

Awards
Frantz Massenat
Team co-Most Valuable Player
First Team NABC All-District Team
CAA All-Conference Fist Team
Assist Award (team leader in assists)
CAA Player Of The Week (3)
2013 NIT Season Tip-Off All-Tournament Team 
Preseason CAA All-Conference Team

Chris Fouch
Team co-Most Valuable Player
Philadelphia Inquirer Academic All-Area Men's Basketball Performer of the Year
Philadelphia Inquirer Academic All-Area Men's Basketball Team (held a 3.56 GPA)
Second Team NABC All-District Team
CAA All-Conference Second Team
CAA Player Of The Week

Rodney Williams
Samuel D. Cozen Award (most improved player)
CAA All-Rookie Team
CAA Rookie Of The Week (2)

Damion Lee
Preseason CAA All-Conference First Team

Tavon Allen
Dragon "D" Award (team's top defensive player)

Dartaye Ruffin
"Sweep" Award (team leader in blocks)

Steve Manojlovic
Team Academic Award (held a 3.62 GPA)

Jake Lerner
Donald Shank Spirit & Dedication Award

References

Drexel Dragons men's basketball seasons
Drexel
Drexel
Drexel